Elections were held in the organized municipalities in the Timiskaming District of Ontario on October 24, 2022 in conjunction with municipal elections across the province.

Armstrong
Jean Marc Boileau was re-elected mayor of Armstrong by acclamation.

Brethour

Casey
Guy Labonté was re-elected as reeve of Casey by acclamation.

Chamberlain
Kerry Stewart was re-elected reeve of Chamberlain by acclamation.

Charlton and Dack
Sandra Dawn Perkin was elected reeve of Charlton and Dack by acclamation.

Cobalt
The following were the results for mayor of Cobalt.

Coleman
The following were the results for mayor of Coleman.

Englehart
The following were the results for mayor of Englehart.

Evanturel
Derek Mundle was re-elected reeve of Evanturel by acclamation.

Gauthier

Harley

Harris
The following were the results for reeve of Harris.

Hilliard
Laurie Bolesworth was re-elected reeve of Hilliard by acclamation.

Hudson
Larry Craig was re-elected reeve of Hudson by acclamation.

James
The following were the results for reeve of James.

Kerns
Terry Phillips was re-elected reeve of Kerns by acclamation.

Kirkland Lake
Mayor Pat Kiely opted to run for a council seat rather than for re-election. The following were the results for mayor of Kirkland Lake.

Larder Lake
Patty Quinn was re-elected mayor of Larder Lake by acclamation.

Latchford
The following were the results for mayor of Latchford.

Matachewan
The following were the results for mayor of Matachewan.

McGarry
The following were the results for mayor of McGarry.

Temiskaming Shores
The following were the results for mayor of Temiskaming Shores.

Thornloe

References

Timiskaming
Timiskaming District